Jason Vega (born May 30, 1987) is a retired Canadian football and American football defensive end. He played the majority of his professional career in the Canadian Football League (CFL), and more specifically with the Winnipeg Blue Bombers. Elsewhere in the CFL he was a member of the Toronto Argonauts and Edmonton Eskimos. In his time in the NFL he was affiliated with the New England Patriots and played for the Dallas Cowboys.

College career
He played college football at Northeastern University.

Professional career

Winnipeg Blue Bombers
Vega signed with the Winnipeg Blue Bombers of the Canadian Football League. During the 2011 Winnipeg Blue Bombers season, Vega was named defensive player of the week for their win over the Alouettes at the end of October. He finished his rookie season in the CFL with 26 tackles and 7 sacks. The following season Vega contributed 40 tackles and 5 quarterback sacks.

New England Patriots
Vega signed with the New England Patriots on January 26, 2013. He was released on August 13, 2013.

Dallas Cowboys
On August 21, 2013, Vega was signed by the Dallas Cowboys. Vega appeared in 2 games for the Cowboys in the 2013 NFL season; tallying 1 tackle.

Winnipeg Blue Bombers (II)
After one season playing in the NFL, Vega signed a new contract with the Bombers on December 23, 2013. Terms of the contract were not released as per team regulations. During the 2014 campaign Vega totaled 16 tackles and 5 sacks. On April 28, 2015 Vega was released by the Blue Bombers; reportedly to free up cap space.

Toronto Argonauts

On June 22, 2015, Vega signed with the Toronto Argonauts of the Canadian Football League. Following the season he was not re-signed and became a free agent.

Edmonton Eskimos 
Vega signed with the Edmonton Eskimos on August 16, 2016. Vega only appeared in 4 games during the 2016 season, contributing 11 tackles and one quarterback sack. After the season, he was released by the Eskimos.

Winnipeg Blue Bombers (III) 
On February 8, 2017 Vega signed a one-day contract with the Blue Bombers and retired.

References

External links
Toronto Argonauts bio

1987 births
Living people
African-American players of Canadian football
American football defensive ends
American players of Canadian football
Canadian football defensive linemen
Dallas Cowboys players
Northeastern Huskies football players
Sportspeople from Brockton, Massachusetts
Toronto Argonauts players
Winnipeg Blue Bombers players
21st-century African-American sportspeople
20th-century African-American people